General Sir James Stuart Steele  (26 October 1894 – 24 July 1975) was a senior British Army officer who served as Adjutant-General to the Forces.

Early life and military career
Born in Ballycarry, County Antrim and educated at the Royal Belfast Academical Institution and at Queen's University Belfast, Steele was gazetted as a temporary second lieutenant in the Royal Irish Rifles, on 26 September 1914 during the First World War and posted to the 7th (Service) Battalion. He served on the Western Front from 1915 to 1917. He served at the battles of Messines, Somme and at Passchendaele. He was given a regular commission in June 1916. He was mentioned in despatches in April 1917 and was awarded the MC in August 1917. Steele served the rest of the war in India and was mentioned in despatches again.

Between the wars
He stayed in the army and attended the Staff College, Quetta from 1927 to 1928. He was promoted to brevet lieutenant colonel on 1 July 1936 and transferred to the Sherwood Foresters and was made a lieutenant colonel on 14 October 1937. Steele commanded the 1st Battalion, Sherwood Foresters from 1937 to 1939: the battalion was deployed to Jamaica in 1937 and to Palestine during the Arab revolt in Palestine in 1939. Returning to England, he was promoted to colonel on 27 June 1939 and made Assistant Adjutant-General at the War Office on the same date.

Second World War
In July 1939, Steele was posted to the mobilization branch of the War Office Staff. He signed the executive signal for the mobilization of the army. He was promoted to brigadier on 8 November 1939 and took over command of the 132nd Infantry Brigade in November 1939. He served in France and Belgium in 1940 and was awarded the Distinguished Service Order (DSO) for his part in the engagement on the River Escaut and the subsequent withdrawal to Dunkirk.

Promoted to the acting rank of major-general on 15 February 1941, he became General Officer Commanding (GOC) of the 59th (Staffordshire) Infantry Division, a second line TA formation. His major-general's rank was made temporary on 15 February 1942. Made an acting lieutenant-general on 8 April 1942, he commanded II Corps until September when he became Deputy Chief of Staff for Middle East Command in 1942. He returned to England and was then appointed Director of Staff Duties at the War Office in 1943, and was made a Companion of the Order of the Bath (CB) on 14 October 1943. He was promoted to major general on 20 September 1944 (with seniority backdated to 4 January 1944).

Postwar

Steele was promoted to lieutenant general in 1946. He was appointed Commander-in-Chief (C-in-C) and High Commissioner in Austria in 1946. In that capacity he signed a treaty with Marshal Tito. He was promoted to general in 1947. He was Adjutant-General to the Forces from 1947 to 1950 when he retired from the British Army.

He was awarded the CB in 1943, the KCB in 1949 and the GCB in 1950. He was also awarded the KBE in 1946.

He was colonel of the Royal Ulster Rifles from 1947 to 1957.

Family
He married Janet Gibson Gordon and together they went on to have two daughters.

Bibliography

References

External links
Generals of World War II

|-

|-

|-
 

|-

1894 births
1975 deaths
British Army generals
Alumni of Queen's University Belfast
British Army generals of World War II
British Army personnel of World War I
British military personnel of the 1936–1939 Arab revolt in Palestine
Companions of the Distinguished Service Order
Graduates of the Staff College, Quetta
Knights Commander of the Order of the British Empire
Knights Grand Cross of the Order of the Bath
Military personnel from County Antrim
People educated at the Royal Belfast Academical Institution
People from County Antrim
Recipients of the Military Cross
Royal Ulster Rifles officers
Sherwood Foresters officers
War Office personnel in World War II